Gostun is a village (село) in southwestern Bulgaria, located in the Bansko Municipality of the Blagoevgrad Province. It is located on the eastern slopes of the Rhodope Mountains, east of Mesta river 17 kilometers southeast of Bansko, 54 kilometers southeast of Blagoevgrad and 103 kilometers southeast of Sofia.

Gostun is the birthplace of Ivan Lebanov - the first Bulgarian to win a Winter Olympic medal in 1980.

References

Villages in Blagoevgrad Province